Vineeta Rastogi (August 4, 1968, in Silver Spring, Maryland – December 6, 1995) was an American AIDS activist, public health worker and Peace Corps Volunteer in Democratic Republic of the Congo.

She attended University of Maryland, Harvard School of Public Health and had been accepted at Johns Hopkins School of Public Health for a Ph.D when she was diagnosed with cancer.  When the disease was terminal she started the Vineeta Foundation to continue her life's work.

She was a delegate to Cairo's International Conference on Population and Development, Yokohama's International AIDS Conference and Asian-American Conference at White House.  She was Co-Chair of the "Violence and Human Rights" Conference and a founding member of Young Indian-American Forum.  She was an Albert Schweitzer Urban Fellow and Award-winner (for outstanding Public Health student).

Legacy
Today the foundation that bears Rastogi's name is a major force in public health and human rights, both domestically and globally.

References

External links
 Vineeta Foundation
 Colman McCarthy's column in the Washington Post about Rastogi

1968 births
1995 deaths
HIV/AIDS activists
Deaths from oral cancer
Peace Corps volunteers
American Hindus
American health activists
University of Maryland, College Park alumni
Harvard School of Public Health alumni
American expatriates in the Democratic Republic of the Congo
American women of Indian descent in health professions
American politicians of Indian descent